Geeta Kapoor is an Indian choreographer and television personality. Currently she is judging “India’s Best Dancer”, a dance reality show on Sony TV along with Malaika Arora and Terence Lewis.

Career
Kapoor started her career when she joined the troupe of noted Bollywood choreographer Farah Khan at the age of 15. She later assisted Farah Khan in many films, including Kuch Kuch Hota Hai, Dil Toh Pagal Hai, Kabhi Khushi Kabhi Gham, Mohabbatein, Kal Ho Na Ho, Main Hoon Na, and Om Shanti Om, and the musical Bombay Dreams (2004). She led choreography in many Bollywood films, including Fiza (2000), Asoka (2001), Saathiya (2002), Heyy Babyy (2007), Thoda Pyaar Thoda Magic (2008), Aladin (2009), Tees Maar Khan's Sheila Ki Jawani' (2010), Tere Naal Love Ho Gaya (2011), and Shirin Farhad Ki Toh Nikal Padi (2012). She has also choreographed award ceremonies and concerts like Temptation Reloaded, and has also choreographed the opening ceremony of Pepsi IPL 2013.

She started out as a secondary background dancer in many song sequences such as the song 'Dum Tara' of Suchitra Krishnamoorthi, 'Tujhe Yaad Na Meri Aaye' from the movie Kuch Kuch Hota Hai, and 'Gori Gori' from Main Hoon Na, using a mix of classical and modern dance moves. Starting in the late 1990s she performed in movies such as Nayak. She also appeared in Kuch Kuch Locha hai.

Kapoor made her television debut with the reality show Dance India Dance (season 1) on Zee TV in 2008, with co-judges choreographers Terrence Lewis and Remo D'Souza. Mithun Chakrabarty was the grand master. She trained a group which was called Geeta Ki Gang.

In 2009, she appeared on the season 2 of Dance India Dance, along with choreographers Terrence Lewis and Remo D'Souza as judges and mentors. They trained 18 contestants in dance forms like ballet, acrobatics, mid-air dancing, contemporary, Bollywood and hip-hop.

She made a special appearance in the show DID Lil Masters, in which her mentor Farah Khan and Sandip Soparkar were the judges, during auditions as well as in a special episode. She also acted as the judge of DID Doubles along with choreographers Marzi Pestonji and Rajiv Surti. She judged the third season of the highly acclaimed show Dance India Dance along with Terrence Lewis, and Remo D'Souza. In 2012, she was seen judging the second season of DID Lil Masters along with Marzi Pestonji. Kapoor was then seen as a judge of Dance Ke Superkids along with Farah Khan and Marzi.

She is a judge on Super Dancer Chapter 4 alongside Shilpa Shetty Kundra and Anurag Basu.

Television

References

External links
 
 Filmography Bollywood Hungama

Indian film choreographers
Living people
Artists from Mumbai
Indian female dancers
Indian women choreographers
Indian choreographers
Dancers from Maharashtra
Women artists from Maharashtra
21st-century Indian dancers
21st-century Indian women artists
Television judges
Year of birth missing (living people)